Martin Wilhelm Ratz (14 October 1887 – 8 August 1943) was an Australian rules footballer who played with University. He was also played cricket and football at Scotch College, Melbourne, before becoming a doctor.

Notes

References
Holmesby, Russell & Main, Jim (2007). The Encyclopedia of AFL Footballers. 7th ed. Melbourne: Bas Publishing.

External links

1887 births
1943 deaths
Australian rules footballers from Melbourne
Australian Rules footballers: place kick exponents
University Football Club players
Medical doctors from Melbourne
People educated at Scotch College, Melbourne
People from Collingwood, Victoria